Zodarion confusum is a spider species found in Italy.

See also 
 List of Zodariidae species

References

External links 

confusum
Spiders of Europe
Spiders described in 1935